The Phoenix Award is a lifetime achievement award for a science fiction professional "who has done a great deal for Southern Fandom." The Phoenix is given annually by DeepSouthCon, a bidded convention held in different states of the former Confederacy.

There is no standard shape or image for the Phoenix as each host convention creates their own unique interpretation of the award. The Phoenix is presented in conjunction with Rebel Award for a science fiction fan meeting similar criteria. The award recipients are chosen by the host convention.

List of Phoenix Award winners

 2021: Allen Wold
 2020: Les Johnson
 2019: Faith Hunter
 2018: Joseph Green
 2017: Simon Hawke, Aaron Allston
 2016: Eugie Foster, Jana Oliver
 2015: Robert Asprin† & Diana Rowland
 2014: Steve Jackson
 2013: Robert Jordan†
 2012: John Ringo
 2011: Selina Rosen
 2010: Jerry Pournelle
 2009: Robert McCammon
 2008: Jim Baen†
 2007: Tom Deitz
 2006: John Kessel
 2005: Jack L. Chalker†
 2004: Dr. Gregory Benford
 2003: Rick Shelley† & Larry Elmore
 2002: Allen Steele
 2001: Sharon Green
 2000: Jack McDevitt
 1999: Danny Frolich
 1998: David Weber
 1997: James P. Hogan
 1996: Jack C. Haldeman
 1995: Darrell Richardson
 1994: Toni Weisskopf
 1993: Terry Bisson
 1992: Brad Linaweaver & Brad Strickland
 1991: Charles L. Grant
 1990: Wilson Tucker
 1989: Robert Adams
 1988: Gerald W. Page
 1987: Orson Scott Card & Hugh B. Cave
 1986: Andrew J. Offutt
 1985: Sharon Webb
 1984: David Drake
 1983: Doug Chaffee & Joe Haldeman
 1982: Kelly Freas
 1981: Mary Elizabeth Counselman
 1980: Piers Anthony
 1979: Jo Clayton
 1978: Karl Edward Wagner
 1977: Michael Bishop
 1976: Manly Wade Wellman & Gahan Wilson
 1975: Andre Norton
 1974: George Alec Effinger
 1973: Thomas Burnett Swann
 1972: No Award Given
 1971: R.A. Lafferty
 1970: Richard Meredith

† = award presented posthumously

References

External links

Regional and local science fiction awards